Zardabad may refer to:

Zardabad, Lorestan
Zardabad, Sistan and Baluchestan